John Mack is the current director of athletics for Princeton University. He previously served as associate athletic director at Northwestern University from 2006 to 2011, before spending 10 years in the legal field as a practicing lawyer. Mack attended college at Princeton University, where he was a sprinter on the school's track and field team, winning the 2000 William Winston Roper Trophy as the university's top male senior athlete. Mack was named athletic director at Princeton University on August 25, 2021.

References

External links
 
Princeton Tigers bio

Living people
African-American college athletic directors in the United States
Princeton Tigers athletic directors
Princeton Tigers men's track and field athletes
Princeton Tigers track and field coaches
Northwestern University alumni
Princeton University alumni
Year of birth missing (living people)